Thomas Newman was a lawyer and the member of the Parliament of England for Marlborough for the parliaments of 1415, March 1416, and 1423.

He was closely associated with Sir William Sturmy.

References

External links 

Members of Parliament for Marlborough
English MPs 1415
Year of birth unknown
Year of death unknown
English lawyers
English MPs March 1416
English MPs 1423